Amphora elegans is a species of diatoms found in Europe.

References

 Diatomées Collection : Text and Tables of Collection des Diatomées du Monde Entier, ed. 1.  Tempère, J. and Peragallo, H. (1889), Imprimerie Hy-Tribout, 43 Rue St. Paul, pass. St. Paul, Paris., pp. 1-62 (Table des provenenaces), pages 1-304

External links
 Amphora elegans at AlgaeBase
 Amphora elegans at WoRMS

Species described in 1893
Thalassiophysales